Matthew Rush may refer to:
Matthew Rush (footballer) (born 1971), English football winger
Matt Rush (born 2001), English football forward